Patrick Alan Hope (born March 6, 1972) is an American politician. Since 2010, he has served in the Virginia House of Delegates, representing the 47th district in Arlington County, outside Washington, D.C. Hope is a member of the Democratic Party.

Early life and education
Hope was born in San Antonio. He attended St. Mary's University there, receiving a B.A. degree in 1993. He then moved to Washington to attend the Catholic University of America, where he received an M.A. in 1996 and a J.D. from the Columbus School of Law in 2001.

House of Delegates
, Hope serves as the Chair of the Public Safety Committee and as a member of the Courts of Justice Committee and the Health, Welfare and Institutions Committee.

On February 8, 2019, after two women had publicly accused Democratic Lieutenant Governor Justin Fairfax of sexual assault, Hope announced that he would introduce articles of impeachment against Fairfax on February 11, three days later, if the latter did not resign by then. Within days, he backed off the plan to begin impeachment proceedings, saying that he had received a lot of feedback that made it clear that more conversations needed to take place before moving forward.

Electoral history
Hope won a five-way Democratic primary in June 2009 to replace retiring Delegate Al Eisenberg as the 47th district delegate. The following November, he won the general election with almost 64% of the vote against two opponents.

See also
 Virginia elections, 2009
 Arlington, Virginia

References

External links
 (campaign finance)

1972 births
Living people
People from San Antonio
Democratic Party members of the Virginia House of Delegates
People from Arlington County, Virginia
St. Mary's University, Texas alumni
Columbus School of Law alumni
21st-century American politicians